The men's hammer throw event was part of the track and field athletics programme at the 1928 Summer Olympics. The competition was held on Monday, July 30, 1928. Sixteen hammer throwers from eleven nations competed. The maximum number of athletes per nation was 4. The event was won by Pat O'Callaghan of Ireland, the first medal for the nation in any Olympic event and the first time the event was won by a non-American (though five of the previous six winners had been born in Ireland before emigrating to the United States). Ossian Skiöld of Sweden took silver, the nation's second medal in the event after another silver in 1920. The Americans, who had earned a gold medal and at least one other medal in each of the previous six hammer throw competitions, took only a bronze this time, with Edmund Black finishing third.

Background

This was the seventh appearance of the event, which has been held at every Summer Olympics except 1896. Three of the six finalists from the 1924 Games returned: bronze medalist Malcolm Nokes of Great Britain, fourth-place finisher Erik Eriksson of Finland, and fifth-place finisher Ossian Skiöld of Sweden. Also returning was 1920 silver medalist (and 1912 finalist and 1924 seventh-place finisher) Carl Johan Lind of Sweden.

Three-time medalist Matt McGrath, then 51 years old, tried to compete again but finished fifth at the U.S. trials to barely miss making the team.

Argentina, Chile, Ireland, Japan, and Norway each made their debut in the event. The United States appeared for the seventh time, the only nation to have competed at each appearance of the event to that point.

Competition format

The competition continued to use the divided-final format used since 1908, with results carrying over between "rounds". Each athlete received three throws in the qualifying round. The top six men advanced to the final, where they received an additional three throws. The best result, qualifying or final, counted.

Records

These were the standing world and Olympic records (in metres) prior to the 1928 Summer Olympics.

No new world or Olympic records were set during the competition.

Schedule

Results

The best six throwers qualified for the final. The throwing order and the throwing series are not available. The final was held on the same day.

References

External links
Olympic Report
 

Hammer
Hammer throw at the Olympics
Men's events at the 1928 Summer Olympics